Back with the Thugz Part 2 is the fourteenth solo studio album by Bizzy Bone released on the Hi-Power Entertainment label on July 14, 2009. The album features appearances by Mr. Capone-e, Mr. Criminal and HPG's.

Critical reception
Back with the Thugz Part 2 received mixed reviews from critics. David Jeffries of Allmusic gave the album 2.5 out of 5. "This second volume is as messy, rushed, and uneven as the first volume, but it's also just as interesting and holds as many highlights, making it of interest to the hardcore fan. The serene Bizzy found on 2008's high-profile release, A Song for You, is wiped off the planet by the vicious ""Empty out My Clip"," a G-funk-fueled rant that touches upon schizophrenia, precious metals, and the rise of Satan while quoting Bone Thugs' classic ""First of the Month"." "Put Your Hands Up" is a club track with enough comparative mythology and comparative religion to interest Joseph Campbell, while "Not Scary" steals a bit of Europe's '80s hit "The Final Countdown" so Bizzy can riff on all of his sins before declaring "Jesus loves reggae" as if it was the path to freedom. Poetic and bizarre interludes just add to the wildness, but the production from Serious Sam, Makavelik, and Nu-Nation is thuggish and familiar, influenced by the West Coast of the '90s and the South of the 2000s. A strange, erratic, and manic side release, Bizzy fanatics have been here before."

Track listing 
 Back With the Thugz Pt. 2
 Empty Out My Clip - (featuring Mr. Capone-E) (Produced by NuNation Productions)
 Put Yo Hands Up
 Dedicated
 I Know
 On The Inside
 Dealing With A Thug - (featuring Mr. Capone-E)
 Breath of Bizzy
 Fire, Fire, Fire
 I Demand Much Respect
 Look Into My Eyes
 Not Scary - (featuring Mr. Criminal)
 Automatic Glock
 Getcha Money
 Always Be With You - (featuring Hazardous)
 Diary of a G (promo) - (featuring Mr. Capone-E, The Game and Snoop Dogg)

References 

Bizzy Bone albums
2009 albums